In mathematics, the Bockstein spectral sequence is a spectral sequence relating the homology with mod p coefficients and the homology reduced mod p.  It is named after Meyer Bockstein.

Definition 
Let C be a chain complex of torsion-free abelian groups and p a prime number. Then we have the exact sequence:

Taking integral homology H, we get the exact couple of "doubly graded" abelian groups:

where the grading goes:  and the same for 

This gives the first page of the spectral sequence: we take  with the differential . The derived couple of the above exact couple then gives the second page and so forth. Explicitly, we have  that fits into the exact couple:

Now, taking  of 

 

we get:

. 

Expanding the exact couple into a long exact sequence, we get: for any r,

.

When , this is the same thing as the universal coefficient theorem for homology.

References
 
 J. P. May, A primer on spectral sequences

Spectral sequences